is a city located in Tochigi Prefecture, Japan. ,  the city had an estimated population of 44,712 in 16,882 households, and a population density of 360 persons per km².

Geography
Sakura is located in central-east Tochigi Prefecture, at the far-northern portion of the Kantō plains. the city is approximately 115 kilometers north of the Tokyo metropolis and 15 kilometers north of the prefectural capital of Utsunomiya. It consists mostly of flat land extending to the east of the Kinugawa River, and hilly land to the east of several tributaries of the Naka River.

Surrounding municipalities
Tochigi Prefecture
 Utsunomiya
 Yaita
 Ōtawara
 Nasukarasuyama
 Nakagawa
 Shioya
 Takanezawa

Climate
Sakura has a Humid continental climate (Köppen Cfa) characterized by warm summers and cold winters with heavy snowfall.  The average annual temperature in Sakura is 13.1 °C. The average annual rainfall is 1425 mm with September as the wettest month. The temperatures are highest on average in August, at around 24.9 °C, and lowest in January, at around 1.6 °C.

Demographics
Per Japanese census data, the population of Sakura has recently plateaued after a long period of growth.

History
The town of  Kitsuregawa  was established on April 1, 1889 with the creation of the modern municipalities system. The city of Sakura was established on March 28, 2005 with the merger of the towns of Kitsuregawa and Ujiie (both from Shioya District).

Government
Sakura has a mayor-council form of government with a directly elected mayor and a unicameral city assembly of 18 members. Sakura, together with the towns of Shioya and Takanezawa collectively contributes two members to the Tochigi Prefectural Assembly. In terms of national politics, the town is part of Tochigi 2nd district of the lower house of the Diet of Japan.

Economy
Agriculture, primarily rice cultivation, is a mainstay of the local economy. The city is increasingly a bedroom community for nearby Utsunomiya.

Education
Sakura has six public primary schools, two public middle schools operated by the city government. The city has one public high school operated by the Tochigi Prefectural Board of Education.

Transportation

Railway
 JR East –  Tōhoku Main Line (Utsunomiya Line)
  -

Highway

Local attractions
Kitsuregawa Castle and the Sakura City Museum of Art are located in Sakura.

References

External links

Official Website 

Cities in Tochigi Prefecture
Sakura, Tochigi